The 1997/98 FIS Nordic Combined World Cup was the 15th world cup season, a combination of ski jumping and cross-country skiing organized by FIS. It started on 28 Nov 1997 in Rovaniemi, Finland and ended on 14 March 1998 in Oslo, Norway.

Calendar

Men

Standings

Overall 

Standings after 14 events.

Nations Cup 

Standings after 14 events.

References

External links
FIS Nordic Combined World Cup 1997/98 

1997 in Nordic combined
1998 in Nordic combined
FIS Nordic Combined World Cup